Kusayanagi (written: 草柳 lit. "grass willow") is a Japanese surname. Notable people with the surname include:

, Japanese voice actress
Kazuhiro Kusayanagi (born 1967), Japanese mixed martial artist

Japanese-language surnames